The Black Album may refer to:

Music
The Black Album (The Damned album), 1980 rock album
The Black Album, 1981 bootleg recording of The Beatles
The Black Album (Prince album), initially cancelled 1987 funk album by American recording artist Prince, released in 1994
The Black Album/Come On Feel The Dandy Warhols, 1996 compilation album by The Dandy Warhols
The Black Album (Jay-Z album), 2003 studio album by American rapper Jay Z
The Black Album (compilation album), 2011 compilation album of former Beatles members' material by Ethan Hawke
 Weezer (Black Album), 2019 album by Weezer
Accept Your Own and Be Yourself (The Black Album), a 1997 hip-hop album by producer No ID
Planxty (album), 1973 Irish folk album by Planxty
Neu! '75, 1975 rock album by Neu!
Black Album (Kino album), 1990
Metallica (album), 1991 metal album by Metallica, commonly referred as The Black Album
The Black Album, 2001 box set by Sinéad O'Connor
The Black Album, CD by Babybird included in the 2002 box set The Original Lo-Fi
Black Album, 2008 album by French rap duo Lunatic
Songs: Ohia, 1997 indie album by Jason Molina known as the Black Album

Other
The Black Album (1996), a novel by Hanif Kureishi
The Black Album (1995), a novel by  Qaisra Shahraz
The Black Album (play), a play based on the book by Hanif Kureishi

See also
Top R&B/Hip-Hop Albums, a Billboard magazine chart formerly listed as Top Black Albums
31 VII 69 10:26-10:49 PM / 23 VIII 64 2:50:45-3:11 AM The Volga Delta, a 1969 album by La Monte Young and Marian Zazeela, unofficially known as the Black Record
The White Album (disambiguation)
Black (disambiguation)